RIU Hotels & Resorts is a Spanish hotel chain founded by the Riu family as a small holiday firm in 1953. It was founded in Mallorca, Spain, and is currently 49% owned by TUI and run by the third generation of the family. The company's business is focused on the holiday hotel sector and over 70% of its establishments offer an all-inclusive service.

With the opening of its first city hotel in 2010, RIU extended its range of products with its own line of city hotels called Riu Plaza. RIU's press dossier for the year 2020 reported that it had 98 locations in 19 countries (apart from the planned RIU Plaza in London), 31,270 employees, and 4.9 million customers.

History
RIU Hotels & Resorts is a Spanish hotel chain founded by the Riu family as a small holiday firm in 1953, the first hotel being Riu San Francisco in Mallorca. The RIU Hotels & Resorts chain is still run by the Riu family's third generation.

In 2011, RIU Hotels & Resorts launched their new line of Riu Plaza city hotels. These are located in the centre of large cities and cater for both business travelers and tourists. RIU has hotels in Spain, Portugal, Ireland, Germany, Bulgaria, Turkey, Tunisia, Morocco, United States, Mexico, Jamaica, Bahamas, Aruba, Costa Rica, Dominican Republic, Panama, Cape Verde, Mauritius, St. Martin and Sri Lanka (2016).

It is the 30th largest hotel chain in the world according to Hotels magazine's 2014 ranking.

Locations

Current locations

Europe 
Germany: (1)
 Hotel RIU PLAZA Berlin (Berlin, Germany)
Ireland: (1)
 Hotel RIU PLAZA The Gresham Dublin (Dublin, Ireland)
Portugal: (1)
 Hotel RIU Madeira (Madeira, Portugal)
Spain: (27)
 Hotel RIU Chiclana (Cadiz, Spain)
 Hotel RIU Calypso, Hotel RIU Oliva Beach Resort, Hotel RIU PALACE Jandia, Hotel RIU PALACE Tres Islas (Fuerteventura, Spain)
 Hotel RIU La Mola (Formentera, Spain)
 Hotel RIU Gran Canaria, Hotel RIU PALACE Maspalomas, Hotel RIU PALACE Meloneras, Hotel RIU PALACE Oasis, Hotel RIU PALACE Palmeras, Hotel RIU Papayas, Hotel RIU Vistamar (Gran Canaria, Spain)
 Hotel RIU Paraiso (Lanzarote, Spain)
 Hotel RIU PLAZA Espana (Madrid, Spain)
 Hotel RIU Monica, Hotel RIU Costa del Sol, Hotel RIU Nautilus (Malaga, Spain)
 Hotel RIU Bravo, Hotel RIU Concordia, Hotel RIU Festival, Hotel RIU Playa Park, Hotel RIU San Francisco (Mallorca, Spain)
 Hotel RIU PALACE Tenerife, Hotel RIU Garoe, Hotel RIU Buenavista, Hotel RIU Arecas (Tenerife, Spain)
United Kingdom: (1)
 Hotel RIU PLAZA London Victoria (London, United Kingdom)

Africa 
Cape Verde: (6)
 Hotel RIU PALACE Boavista, Hotel RIU Tuareg, Hotel RIU Karamboa (Boa Vista, Cape Verde)
 Hotel RIU PALACE Santa Maria, Hotel RIU Cabo Verde, Hotel RIU Funana (Sal, Cape Verde)
Mauritius: (2)
 Hotel RIU Creole, Hotel RIU Le Morne (Le Morne Brabant, Mauritius)
Morocco: (6)
 Hotel RIU PALACE Tikida Agadir, Hotel RIU PALACE Tikida Taghazout, Hotel RIU Tikida Beach, Hotel RIU Tikida Dunas (Agadir, Morocco)
 Hotel RIU Tikida Garden, Hotel RIU Tikida Palmeraie (Marrakech, Morocco)
Senegal: (1)
 Hotel RIU Baobab (Pointe-Sarène, Senegal)
Tanzania: (2)
 Hotel RIU PALACE Zanzibar, Hotel RIU Jambo (Zanzibar, Tanzania)

Asia 
Maldives: (2)
 Hotel RIU PALACE Maldivas, Hotel RIU Atoll (Dhaalu Atoll, Maldives)
Sri Lanka: (1)
 Hotel RIU Sri Lanka (Ahungalla, Sri Lanka)
United Arab Emirates: (1)
 Hotel RIU Dubai (Dubai, United Arab Emirates)

America 
Aruba: (2)
 Hotel RIU PALACE Antillas, Hotel RIU PALACE Aruba (Aruba-Palm Beach, Aruba)
Bahamas: (1)
 Hotel RIU PALACE Paradise Island (Paradise Island, Bahamas)
Costa Rica: (2)
 Hotel RIU PALACE Costa Rica, Hotel RIU Guanacaste (Guanacaste, Costa Rica)
Dominican Republic: (6)
 Hotel RIU PALACE Bavaro, Hotel RIU PALACE Macao, Hotel RIU PALACE Punta Cana, Hotel RIU Bambu, Hotel RIU Naiboa, Hotel Riu Republica (Punta Cana, Dominican Republic)
Jamaica: (6)
 Hotel RIU PALACE Jamaica, Hotel RIU Reggae, Hotel RIU Montego Bay (Montego Bay, Jamaica)
 Hotel RIU PALACE Tropical Bay, Hotel RIU Negril (Negril, Jamaica)
 Hotel RIU Ocho Rios (Ocho Rios, Jamaica)
Mexico: (21)
 Hotel RIU PALACE Costa Mujeres, Hotel RIU PALACE Las Americas, Hotel RIU PALACE Peninsula, Hotel RIU Latino, Hotel RIU Caribe, Hotel RIU Cancun, Hotel RIU Dunamar (Cancun, Mexico)
 Hotel RIU PLAZA Guadalajara (Guadalajara, Mexico)
 Hotel RIU PALACE Baja California, Hotel RIU PALACE Cabo San Lucas, Hotel RIU Santa Fe ((Los Cabos, Mexico)
 Hotel RIU Emerald Bay (Mazatlan, Mexico)
 Hotel RIU PALACE Mexico, Hotel RIU PALACE Riviera Maya, Hotel RIU Playacar, Hotel RIU Lupita, Hotel RIU Tequila, Hotel RIU Yucatan (Playa del Carmen, Mexico)
 Hotel RIU PALACA Pacifico, Hotel RIU Vallarta, Hotel RIU Jalisco (Nayarit, Mexico)
Panama: (2)
 Hotel RIU PLAZA Panama (Panama City, Panama)
 Hotel RIU Playa Blanca (Playa Blanca, Panama)
United States: (4)
 Hotel RIU PLAZA Miami Beach (Miami Beach, United States)
 Hotel RIU PLAZA Manhattan Times Square, Hotel RIU PLAZA New York Times Square (New York City, United States)
 Hotel RIU PLAZA Fisherman's Wharf (San Francisco, United States)

According to RIU's website, RIU operates 103 locations, of which 34 are in Spain and 21 in Mexico.

Future locations 

As of May 2022, six new locations are under construction:

 Hotel RIU Latino (Cancun, Mexico)
 Hotel RIU Baobab (Pointe-Sarène, Senegal)
 Hotel RIU Jambo (Zanzibar, Tanzania)
 Hotel RIU Plaza Manhattan Times Square (New York City, United States)
 Untitled hotel in London, United Kingdom
 Untitled RIU Plaza hotel in Toronto, Canada

Former locations

References

Companies of the Balearic Islands
Hotel chains in Spain
Hospitality companies of Spain
Spanish brands
1953 establishments in Spain
TUI Group